Maurice Michael Tyler (born July 19, 1950 in Baltimore, Maryland) was an American football defensive back in the National Football League for the Buffalo Bills, Denver Broncos, San Diego Chargers, Detroit Lions, New York Jets, and the New York Giants.  He also spent the 1983 season with the Chicago Blitz and the Denver Gold and the 1984 season with the San Antonio Gunslingers of the United States Football League USFL.

Background
Tyler grew up in Baltimore and graduated from Mergenthaler Vocational Technical Senior High School. He played college football at Morgan State University.
Tyler is the athletic director at W. E. B. Du Bois High School in Baltimore.

1950 births
Living people
Players of American football from Baltimore
American football defensive backs
Buffalo Bills players
Denver Broncos players
San Diego Chargers players
Detroit Lions players
New York Jets players
New York Giants players